Robert Oblak (born 3 May 1968) is a former Slovenian footballer.

Career
Oblak has been capped three times for the Slovenian national team in 1994.

External links
Player profile at NZS 

1968 births
Living people
Slovenian footballers
Slovenian PrvaLiga players
Slovenian Second League players
Slovenia international footballers
Association football defenders
Footballers from Ljubljana
NK Krka players
NK Olimpija Ljubljana (1945–2005) players
NK Zagorje players
NK Ljubljana players
NK Ivančna Gorica players
NK Rudar Velenje players